Fuat Saka (born 1952) is a Turkish singer, songwriter, arranger, and guitarist (although he may be more precisely called a multi-instrumentalist).

Saka received art training in İstanbul and later music training in France and (Germany). He had to leave Turkey in 1980, after the coup for political reasons. He lived in Europe up until 1998, travelling and collaborating with numerous musicians. Saka still divides most of his time between İstanbul, Hamburg, and Paris and tours several countries with his Fuat Saka International Group consisting of German, American, Georgian, and Azerbaijani musicians.  He is of also Georgian descent by his mother. He has performed with Greek musicians Nikos Papazoglou and Dionysis Savvopoulos since the mid-1980s.

Discography
 1982 Yıkılır Zulmün Son Kaleleri
 1983 Ayrılık Türküsü
 1984 Kerem Gibi (Poems of Nazım Hikmet)
 1987 Sevdalı Türküler
 1988 Nebengleis (Kenardaki Ray)
 1989 Askaros
 1991 Semahlar ve Deyişler
 1993 Şiirce
 1994 Torik Baliklar Ülkesinde
 1996 Arhavili İsmail
 1997 Lazutlar
 1998 Sen
 2000 Lazutlar II
 2001 Perçem Perçem
 2002 Lazutlar III
 2004 Lazutlar Livera
 2005 Lazutlar (Seçmeler) 
 2006 Bir Sürgünün Not Defteri
 2006 Fuat Saka Koleksiyon (3 CD)
 2008 Lazutlar 2008
 2012 Nenni

References 

1952 births
Living people
Turkish musicians
Turkish people of Georgian descent